Luke Bell may refer to:

Luke Bell (musician) (1990–2022),  American country singer-songwriter
Luke Bell (triathlete) (born 1979), Australian triathlete
Luke Maximo Bell (born 1994), South African filmmaker